The 213th Coastal Division was an infantry division of the Royal Italian Army during World War II. Royal Italian Army coastal divisions were second line divisions formed with reservists and equipped with second rate materiel. Recruited locally, they were often commanded by officers called out of retirement.

History 
The division was activated on 15 November 1941 in Catania and assigned to XVI Army Corps, which was responsible for the defense of the eastern half of the island of Sicily. The division was responsible for the coastal defense of the coast between Punta Castelluccio in Agnone Bagni and Moleti south of Messina. The division fought against units of the British Eighth Army after the allies landed on Sicily on 10 July 1943. By 15 July 1943 the division had been severely decimated and was therefore officially declared lost due to wartime events.

Organization July 1943
 213th Coastal Division
 135th Coastal Regiment
 CII Coastal Battalion
 LXVI Replacements Battalion
 CCCLXIX Coastal Battalion
 CCCLXXII Coastal Battalion
 140th Coastal Regiment (regimental command transferred without its battalion to the XIX Coastal Brigade in May 1943)
 CCXXVIII Replacements Battalion
 CCCLXXIII Coastal Battalion
 21st Coastal Artillery Regiment
 XXX Coastal Artillery Group (105/28 howitzers)
 CXLIV Coastal Artillery Group (105/14 howitzers)
 CCXXX Coastal Artillery Group (100/22 howitzers)
 553rd Machine Gun Company
 554th Machine Gun Company
 135th Mixed Engineer Platoon
 213th Carabinieri Section
 166th Field Post Office
 Division Services

Attached to the division:
 Harbor Defense Command "H", in Catania
 CDXXXIV Coastal Battalion
 CDLXXVII Coastal Battalion
 XXVI Coastal Artillery Group (75/27 field guns)
 105th Mortar Company (81mm Mod. 35 mortars)
 Armored Train 120/4/S, in Catania (6x 102/35 Mod. 1914 naval guns, 4x 20/77 anti-aircraft guns)

Commanding officers 
The division's commanding officers were:

 Generale di Brigata Nazzareno Scattaglia (15 November 1941 - 5 March 1942)
 Generale di Brigata Azzo Passalacqua (acting, 6-15 March 1942)
 Generale di Brigata Nazzareno Scattaglia (16 March 1942 - 9 September 1942)
 Generale di Brigata Ugo Buttà (10 September 1942 - 13 October 1942)
 Generale di Brigata Antonio Tosi (14 October 1942 - 9 May 1943)
 Generale di Brigata Carlo Gotti (9 May 1943 - 15 July 1943)

References 

 
 

Coastal divisions of Italy
Infantry divisions of Italy in World War II